Árni Jóhannsson Bergmann (born 22 August 1935) is an Icelandic writer, newspaper editor, literary critic, and translator of Russian literary works.

Career 
Bergmann studied Russian at Moscow State University and received his Master of Arts from the institution in 1962. Shortly thereafter, he joined the staff of the Socialist-leaning Icelandic newspaper Þjóðviljinn as a journalist and columnist. He became the paper’s foremost literary critic and served as editor-in-chief during 1978 to 1992.

In addition to his work with Þjóðviljinn, Bergmann taught classes in literature, literary history, and various topics in Russian literature and language at the University of Iceland from 1973 until 2004.

He is best known for his third novel, Þorvaldur víðförli: Skáldsaga ('Thorvald Widely-Travelled: A Novel'), a fictionalized account of the life of tenth century Icelandic skald and missionary Þorvaldur víðförli, which was published in 1994. The novel earned him nomination for the Icelandic Literary Prize in 1994 and the Nordic Council Literature Prize in 1998. In 2015, he published a Russian translation of Þorvaldur víðförli

One of Iceland’s most prolific literary translators, he has translated a broad variety of works from Russian to Icelandic. Most of his translations are focused on works from the late nineteenth and first half of the twentieth century and include, for example, novels by Nina Berberova and Valentin Katayev; short stories by Anton Chekhov, Nikolai Gogol, Daniil Kharms, and Mikhail Sholokhov; poems by Osip Mandelstam, Vladimir Mayakovsky, and Boris Pasternak; and essays by Ilya Ehrenburg and Viktor Shklovsky, among many others.

Personal life 
Bergmann was born in Keflavík, an Icelandic town southwest of Reykjavík, on 22 August 1935 to Jóhann Stefánsson Bergmann (1906–1996), a fisherman and driver, and Halldóra Árnadóttir (1914–2006), a housewife. He is the second eldest of four brothers, the others being Hörður, born in 1933; Stefán, born in 1942; and Jóhann, born in 1946.

His wife was Lena Bergmann (1935–2008), born Elena Rytsjardovna Túvína in Ryazan, Russian SFSR, Soviet Union, the eldest child of Soffía, a dentist, and Ryszard Tuwim, an engineer. Lena and Árni met while both were studying Russian at the Moscow State University and were married in the fall of 1958. Their first child, Snorri, was born in 1961, when they were still living in Moscow. The young family moved to Iceland in 1962. Their second child, Olga Soffía, was born in 1967. Together, Árni and Lena wrote Blátt og rautt: bernska og unglingsár í tveim heimum ('Blue and Red: Childhood and Adolescence in Two Worlds'), contrasting their experiences growing up in Iceland and the Soviet Union, respectively.

Bergmann has never taken a drivers test and bicycling has been his primary means of transportation since returning to Iceland form Russia in 1962.

Bibliography 
This list of works written and/or translated by Árni Jóhannsson Bergmann is incomplete.

Fiction 
Bergman has written four novels and two children’s books.

Novels 

 Geirfuglarnir ('The Great Auks') – 1982
 Með kveðju frá Dublin ('With Greetings from Dublin') – 1984
 Þorvaldur víðförli ('Thorvald the Widely-Travelled') – 1994
 Sægreifi deyr ('Death of a Sea-Baron') – 1999

Children’s books 

 Stelpan sem var hrædd við dýr ('The Girl Who Was Afraid of Animals') – 1994, with illustrations by Olga Bergmann
 Óskastundir: saga handa börnum ('Wishing Hours: A Tale for Children') – 1997, with illustrations by Margrét Laxness

Non-fiction 

  ('Acting Seriously: The Biography of Gunnar Eyjólfsson') – 2010

Memoirs 

 Miðvikudagar í Moskvu ('Wednesdays in Moscow') – 1979
 Blátt og rautt: bernska og unglingsár í tveim heimum ('Blue and Red: Childhood and Adolescence in Two Worlds') – 1986, with Lena Bergmann

 ('I Still Have One Thing: Memories') – 2015

Scholarly works 

 Listin að lesa ('The Art of Reading') – 2005
Glíman við Guð ('Wresting with God') – 2008

Translations to Icelandic

Novels 

  (1990) –  The Accompanist by Nina Berberova
 (1991) – The Black Malady by Nina Berberova
 (1998)  – Time, Forward! by Valentin Katayev
 (2001) – The State Counsellor by Boris Akunin
 (2003) – Coronation, or the last of the Romanovs by Boris Akunin
 – The Winter Queen, or Fandorin's First Case by Boris Akunin
 (2005) – Murder on the Leviathan by Boris Akunin

Plays 

  (1996) – The Suicide by Nikolai Erdmann
 (1999) – Stars in the Morning Sky by Alexander Galin
 (1989) – Summerfolk by Maxim Gorky

Short stories 

  (1987) – "Shibalok's Seed" from Tales from the Don by Mikhail Sholokhov
  ('Poems Heard in the 20th Century') (1987) – by Andrei Bitov
  (1994) – "About Love" by Anton Chekhov
  (1994) – "The Lottery Ticket” by Anton Chekhov
 (1998) – "The Lady with the Dog" and other short stories by Anton Chekhov
 ('Daniil Kharms: Smell of Burnt Feathers') (2000) – selected short stories by Daniil Kharms, published as a special edition of the literary journal Bjartur og frú Emilía
Mírgorod (2006) by Nikolai Gogol, translated by Árni Bergmann, Áslaug Agnarsdóttir, and Þórarinn Kristjánsson

Other 

 (1957) – essay by Ilya Ehrenburg
 ('Café Rotonde: Chapters from the first book of memoirs') (1961) – selections from the memoirs of Ilya Ehrenburg
 (1961) – selected passages from People, Years, Life by Ilya Ehrenburg
 ('Letters') (1987) – selected works by Isaac Babel 
 (1987) – by Vladimir Mayakovsky 
 (1987) – by Boris Pasternak 
 (1987) – poem by Yevgeny Yevtushenko
 ('[Untitled]') (1987) – poem by Osip Mandelstam
 (1994) – by Anton Chekhov
 (1997) – translation of the epic poem The Tale of Igor's Campaign from Old East Slavic and accompanying text drawing parallels between 'Russian epic poetry and Icelandic ancient literature'
 ('Russian Futurism') (2001) – collected manifestos of Russian Futurists

 ('Russian Stories') (2009) – selected passages from the Chronicle of Bygone Years and other Old Russian letopises

See also 

 List of Icelandic writers
 Icelandic literature

References

External links
Icelandic literature site
Iceland authors

Living people
1935 births
Arni Bergmann
Arni Bergmann
Translators to Icelandic
Translators from Russian
Translators of Boris Pasternak
Translators to Russian
Recipients of the Order of the Falcon
Russian literary historians
Soviet literary historians
Arni Bergmann